Bernard Castagnède, is a French politician. From 1994-1999 he served as a Member of the European Parliament as a member of Radical Party of the Left

References

Living people
1944 births
MEPs for France 1994–1999
Radical Party of the Left MEPs
Politicians from Bordeaux